Cole Weston (January 30, 1919 – April 20, 2003) was photographer Edward Weston's fourth and youngest son. Although Weston "was born into the tradition of craftsman- produced black-and-white art photography, he was to find his own photographic direction in colour.".

Cole Weston's life followed a diverse course that started with theater, later leading him to the Navy, a position photographing for Life, and later photographing portraits, before he moved to Carmel, California in 1946, at his father's request. In the years that followed, Cole became his father's assistant and trusted companion; and, as Edward's struggle with Parkinson's disease worsened, Cole became the keeper of two careers, his father's and his own. Before his death in 2003, Cole Weston was devoted to keeping both bodies of work flourishing and circulating widely.

Early life 
Cole graduated with a degree in theater arts from the Cornish School in Seattle in 1937. Cole served in the United States Navy during World War II as a welder and photographer in Norman, OK.

Assisting Edward Weston and discovering color (1946–1958) 
Upon his discharge from the navy, Cole started photographing for Life in Southern California. At the same time, Edward became increasingly crippled by Parkinson's disease and wrote to Cole asking for his help with the printing of his negatives; and so, in 1946, Cole and his wife moved to Carmel to help his ailing father in his darkroom and studio. Cole and his brother Brett Weston printed their father's negatives under his supervision.

At the time, Eastman Kodak sent their new color films Kodachrome and Ektachrome to Edward because they wanted him to "photograph Point Lobos in color" to which Edward responded: "Well, I don’t know anything about color, but I know Point Lobos better than any man alive". With the leftover film, Cole began experimenting with the new medium and, in 1957, he created his first color prints of the California coastline.

"I’m a color photographer. That’s what I do. Whether you like it or not, that’s what I do. There is nothing wrong with black and white, but I am into color. And I like it!"

The second Forest Theater Guild 

In 1971, Cole Weston established the second Forest Theater Guild in Carmel, CA and began directing productions on the outdoor stage during spring and summer months. Weston worked with the Forest Theater Guild for 50 years in which he directed more than 30 plays and was involved with the physical construction of the Indoor Forest Theater (a small theater beneath the outdoor stage) "hauling in the concrete and other building materials himself".

Edward Weston's negatives and the Cole Weston Trust 
In his will, Edward Weston left his negatives to Cole, who printed them for more than 30 years. On September 30, 2014, a collection of 548 prints from Edward's negatives, printed posthumously by Cole, was auctioned by Sotheby's in New York.

Publications 
 1981 – Cole Weston, eighteen photographs
 1998 – Cole Weston: At Home and Abroad
 1991 – Cole Weston, fifty years
 1995 – Not Man Apart: Photographs of the Big Sur Coast
 2000 – Laughing Eyes: A Book of Letters Between Edward and Cole Weston, 1923–1946

References 

20th-century American photographers
Color photography
1919 births
2003 deaths
Cornish College of the Arts alumni
Photographers from California